Christian Lenzer (19 February 1933 - 21 September 2022) was a German politician of the Christian Democratic Union (CDU) and former member of the German Bundestag.

Life 
Lenzer was a secondary school teacher by profession and has been a member of the CDU since 1963. He was a member of the German Bundestag from 1969 to 1998. With the exception of the 1983 federal elections, Lenzer was always elected to the Bundestag via the Hessen state list. In 1983 Lenzer was elected directly in the constituency of Lahn-Dill.

Literature

References

1933 births
2022 deaths
Members of the Bundestag for Hesse
Members of the Bundestag 1994–1998
Members of the Bundestag 1990–1994
Members of the Bundestag 1987–1990
Members of the Bundestag 1983–1987
Members of the Bundestag 1980–1983
Members of the Bundestag 1976–1980
Members of the Bundestag 1972–1976
Members of the Bundestag 1969–1972
Members of the Bundestag for the Christian Democratic Union of Germany
People from Lahn-Dill-Kreis